Daffadar (Hindustani: दफ़ादार (Devanagari) ;  (Nastaliq)) is the equivalent rank to sergeant in the Indian and Pakistani cavalry, as it was formerly in the British Indian Army. The rank below is lance daffadar. The equivalent in infantry and other units is havildar. Like a British sergeant, a daffadar wears three rank chevrons.

The etymology of the word is unclear. The -dar suffix, found in havildar and other words, means "holder". Thus the word means "holder of dafa' ". The intended meaning of dafa' is, however, unclear. In Arabic it means "pay" or "push", while in Persian, the more obvious source of the word, it means repulsion. It is unclear what role, if any, the word daffadar indicated in the Mughal Empire before it was used as a British Raj rank.

References

Cavalry
Persian words and phrases
Military of the Mughal Empire
Military ranks of British India
Military ranks of the Indian Army
Pakistan Army ranks